is the eleventh single by Japanese boy band KAT-TUN. It was released on February 10, 2010 by their record label J-One Records. The title track was used as the theme song for the Tokyo Broadcasting System drama, Yamato Nadeshiko Shichi Henge, which stars member Kazuya Kamenashi.

Background
In late December 2009, it was confirmed that the B-side of the single, "The D-Motion", would be used to promote , where the group would also appear in the commercial. In the following month, it was announced KAT-TUN was to perform the theme song to member Kazuya Kamenashi's drama on TBS, Yamato Nadeshiko Shichi Henge. It was also announced that the title of the song was "Love Yourself (Kimi ga Kirai na Kimi ga Suki)" and that the song was written to convey the message of the drama.

Single information
The single is released in three pressings - two different limited editions which both include a DVD featuring the single's two music videos for the title track (in Type A) and "The D-Motion" (in Type B) and a featurette of the making of the music videos respectively. The two limited edition pressings also feature two new solo songs by members Kazuya Kamenashi ("") and Jin Akanishi ("A Page") in Type A and Type B, respectively.

Promotion

On January 29, 2010, KAT-TUN performed "The D-Motion" on Music Station.

Chart performance
The single sold 157,000 copies on its first day, debuting at No. 1 on the Oricon Daily Singles Chart. By the end of the week, KAT-TUN gained their eleventh consecutive number one single on the Oricon Weekly Singles Chart since their debut, selling 354,231 copies and holding the second most consecutive number one singles since debut with fellow Johnny's group, NEWS. This was KAT-TUN's first single to sell more than 350,000 copies in its first week since the May 2008 release of their single "Don't U Ever Stop," which sold more than 381,000 copies in its first week. At the end of the year, Billboard Japan announced the single as the 9th Hot Singles Sales Year End 2010.

By the end of the year, Love Yourself (Kimi ga Kirai na Kimi ga Suki) was reported by Oricon to sell 439,736 copies and was later certified Platinum by RIAJ denoting over 250,000 shipments.

Track listing

Charts and certifications

Charts

Sales and certifications

| Japan (RIAJ)
| Platinum
| 439,736
|-
|}

References

External links
 "Love Yourself (Kimi ga Kirai na Kimi ga Suki)" product information 

KAT-TUN songs
2010 singles
Oricon Weekly number-one singles
Japanese television drama theme songs
Billboard Japan Hot 100 number-one singles
Songs written by Koki Tanaka
2009 songs